The Venus figurines of Balzi Rossi (also: Venus figurines of Grimaldi, Venus figurines from the Balzi-Rossi-Caves) from the caves near Grimaldi di Ventimiglia (Italy) are thirteen Paleolithic sculptures of the female body. Additionally, two small depictions of the human head were discovered at the same place. The age of these figurines cannot be determined because of missing archaeological context data. It is usually accepted that these figurines stem from the Gravettian, about 24,000 to 19,000 years old. Most of the sculptures consist of steatite and are between 2.4 and 7.5 cm in height.
Between 1883 to 1895 the figurines were discovered by the antique dealer Louis Alexandre Jullien at the cave complex Balzi Rossi ("red cliffs") at the Ligurian coast. Eight of these sculptures are housed in the museum Saint-Germain-en-Laye near Paris.

See also 
 Venus figurines
 Grimaldi man

References

Literature 
 Bisson, M.; Bolduc P. (1994). Previously undescribed Figurines from the Grimaldi Caves, Current Anthropology, 35 (4), S. 458–468.
 Clark, P. et al. (2009). "The Last Glacial Maximum", American Association for the Advancement of Science, 7 August 2009, 325 (5941), S. 710 – 714.
 Cohen, C. (2003). La femme des origines. Images de la femme dans la préhistoire occidentale, Paris, Belin-Herscher, 2003, 191 pages.
 Delporte, H. (1979). L’image de la femme dans l’art préhistorique, Paris: Ed. Picard.
 C. Giraudi, Margherita Mussi (1999). The Central and Southern Apennine (Italy) during OIS 3 and 2: the colonisation of a changing environment, ERAUL, 90, S. 118 – 129.
 Mussi, M. (2002). Earliest Italy: an overview of the Italian Pateolithic and Mesolithic New York: Kluwer Academic, 2002. 
 White, R., Bisson, M. (1998). Imagerie féminine du Paléolithique : l'apport des nouvelles statuettes de Grimaldi, Gallia préhistoire. Tome 40, 1998. S. 95–132. 

External links 
 Don Hitchcock (Don's Maps): "Figurines of Balzi Rossi, the Grimaldi Caves venuses"
 http://www.historymuseum.ca/cmc/exhibitions/archeo/paleofig/pal03eng.shtml

Balzi Rossi
Archaeological discoveries in Italy
Stone sculptures in Italy
Gravettian
1880s archaeological discoveries
1890s archaeological discoveries